Hancock County–Bar Harbor Airport  is a county-owned, public-use airport located in Trenton, Maine, eight nautical miles (9 mi, 15 km) northwest of the central business district of Bar Harbor, a city in Hancock County, Maine, United States. It serves the residents of Hancock County with commercial and charter aviation services. During the summer months, the airport becomes one of Maine's busiest, with significant private jet operations bringing visitors to the numerous summer colonies in the county, which includes Mount Desert Island. Scheduled passenger airline service is subsidized by the Essential Air Service program.

As per Federal Aviation Administration records, the airport had 10,562 passenger boardings (enplanements) in calendar year 2008, 10,100 enplanements in 2009, and 11,109 in 2010. It is included in the Federal Aviation Administration (FAA) National Plan of Integrated Airport Systems for 2017–2021, in which it is categorized as a non-primary commercial service facility.

History 
The airport operated as Bar Harbor Naval Auxiliary Air Facility (NAAF) supporting operations of Naval Air Station Brunswick from September 1, 1943 until November 15, 1945.

In July 2010, sitting United States president Barack Obama landed at the airport, in a smaller version of Air Force One, for a vacation with his family.

Facilities and aircraft 
Hancock County–Bar Harbor Airport covers an area of 468 acres (189 ha) at an elevation of 83 feet (25 m) above mean sea level. It has two asphalt paved runways: 4/22 is 5,200 by 100 feet (1,585 x 30 m) and 17/35 is 3,253 by 75 feet (992 x 23 m). The airport is an uncontrolled airport that has no control tower.

For the 12-month period ending September 30, 2016, the airport had 21,250 aircraft operations, an average of 58 per day: 84% general aviation, 8% scheduled commercial, 7% air taxi, and <1% military. In September 2017, there were 33 aircraft based at this airport: 32 single-engine and 1 glider.

Airlines and destinations

Cape Air operates Cessna 402 twin prop aircraft with code sharing agreements with American Airlines, JetBlue Airways and United Airlines.  Previously, the airport was additionally served by Silver Airways Saab 340 and PenAir during the summer months.

Statistics

Carrier shares

Top destinations

Images

References

Other sources 

 Essential Air Service documents (Docket OST-2011-0185) from the U.S. Department of Transportation:
 Order 2011-11-26 (November 22, 2011): prohibiting Colgan Air, Inc., operating as US Airways Express, from terminating its subsidized service at Bar Harbor and Presque Isle/Houlton, Maine (Presque Isle), and Plattsburgh, New York, and requesting proposals from airlines interested in providing replacement essential air service (EAS) at any or all of the communities, with or without subsidy.
 Order 2012-3-2 (March 2, 2012): making Essential Air Service (EAS) air carrier selections at Bar Harbor and Presque Isle, Maine, and Plattsburgh, New York. At Bar Harbor, Hyannis Air Service Inc., operating as Cape Air, and Peninsula Airways, Inc. (PenAir) will jointly provide EAS for a four-year term beginning when either carrier begins providing full EAS. PenAir will operate only the peak summer months from Memorial Day through Labor Day, and will operate two daily nonstop round trips to Boston using 34-seat Saab 340 aircraft subsidy free. Cape Air will operate on a year-round basis, providing one daily round trip (seven a week) from Memorial Day through Labor Day, and three daily round trips (21 a week) from September through May using 9-seat Cessna 402 aircraft for an annual subsidy rate of $1,631,223.

External links 

 Hancock County-Bar Harbor Airport, official site
 Aerial image from USGS The National Map
 

Airports in Maine
Essential Air Service
Bar Harbor, Maine
Transportation buildings and structures in Hancock County, Maine